St Stephen's Church is a small church in the centre of Exeter. It has a Saxon crypt but the first mention of the church is in the Domesday Book. Its location (now near the middle of the High Street) was formerly opposite the medieval guildhall. In July 2012 it reopened following a major renovation which cost £1.5 million.

References

Further reading
Orme, Nicholas (2014) The Churches of Medieval Exeter, Impress Books, ISBN 9781907605512; pp. 166-69.

External links 
 St Stephen's Church

Exeter
Churches in Exeter
Exeter
Tourist attractions in Exeter